Cameron Brink (born December 31, 2001) is an American college basketball player for the Stanford Cardinal of the Pac-12 Conference in NCAA Division I. She attended Mountainside High School and Southridge High School, both in Beaverton, Oregon, where she earned McDonald's All-American honors and was ranked the number three player in her class by ESPN. As a freshman at Stanford, Brink helped her team win the national championship and broke the school single-season record for blocks. In her sophomore season, she was named Pac-12 Co-Player of the Year and led Stanford to the Final Four.

Early life
Cameron Brink was born on December 31, 2001, in Princeton, New Jersey, to Greg Brink and Michelle Bain-Brink. Her family are close friends with the family of Stephen Curry, whose mother, Sonya, is Brink's godmother. Her mother was roommates with Sonya at Virginia Tech, where her father played with Curry's father, Dell, on the basketball team. Brink lived in Amsterdam for three years because of her parents' jobs at Nike and returned to the United States when she was in sixth grade. She was not interested in basketball until age 10, preferring art as a child, but started playing the sport in Amsterdam and joined a club in Oregon one year later.

High school career
Brink played basketball for Southridge High School in Beaverton, Oregon for three seasons. As a freshman, she averaged 12.5 points, 8.5 rebounds and 3.7 blocks per game, leading her team to a Class 6A state title. Brink won a second straight state championship as a sophomore, averaging 17.1 points, 10.5 rebounds and 2.7 blocks per game. She was named Oregon Gatorade Player of the Year. As a junior, Brink averaged 21.3 points and 11.1 rebounds per game, and led Southridge to the 6A state final. She received USA Today Oregon Player of the Year honors and repeated as Oregon Gatorade Player of the Year. For her senior season, Brink transferred to Mountainside High School in Beaverton. She averaged 19.7 points, 13.2 rebounds, 3.1 assists, 2.5 steals and 2.5 blocks per game as a senior. She missed five games with a high ankle sprain and played through injury at the state tournament. Brink was selected to play in the McDonald's All-American Game and the Jordan Brand Classic, which were both canceled due to the COVID-19 pandemic. She also played volleyball in high school, winning the state title as a freshman at Southridge.

Recruiting
Brink was considered a five-star recruit and the number three player in the 2020 class by ESPN. On November 7, 2018, she committed to Stanford over scholarship offers from Oregon and UConn. Brink described Stanford as her dream school and was drawn there by her relationships with head coach Tara VanDerveer and assistant coach Kate Paye. She also felt that attending the university would benefit her after her playing career due to its strong academic prowess.

College career

On November 25, 2020, Brink made her college debut, recording 17 points and 9 rebounds in a 108–40 win over Cal Poly. On March 5, 2021, she posted a season-high 24 points while also having 11 rebounds and 5 blocks in a 79–45 victory against Oregon State at the Pac-12 Tournament semifinals. Brink was named to the all-tournament team after Stanford won the Pac-12 Tournament. Brink helped her team win its first national championship since 1992, contributing 10 points, 6 rebounds and 3 blocks in a 54–53 win over Arizona in the title game. As a freshman, Brink averaged 9.9 points, 6.6 rebounds and 2.8 blocks per game, and was selected to the Pac-12 All-Freshman Team and All-Pac-12 Honorable Mention. She set a program single-season record with 88 blocks. 

In her sophomore season, Brink assumed a leading role for Stanford with Haley Jones. On November 25, 2021, she recorded 21 points, 22 rebounds and 5 blocks in a 69–66 win over fourth-ranked Indiana. On January 30, 2022, Brink had 25 points and 15 rebounds in a 75–69 victory over eighth-ranked Arizona. On February 6, she posted a career-high 26 points and grabbed 14 rebounds in an 83–57 win against USC. Brink helped Stanford win the Pac-12 Tournament, where she was named to the all-tournament team. In the Elite Eight of the 2022 NCAA tournament, she posted 10 points, 6 rebounds and 6 blocks in a 59–50 win over Texas, leading her team back to the Final Four. As a sophomore, Brink averaged 13.5 points, 8.1 rebounds and 2.6 blocks per game, setting a new program single-season record with 91 blocks. She led Stanford with 13 double-doubles. She earned Pac-12 Player of the Year from the media, Pac-12 Defensive Player of the Year, All-Pac-12 Team and All-Defensive Team honors. Brink was named a third-team All-American by the Associated Press and United States Basketball Writers Association, and made the Women's Basketball Coaches Association All-America team.

Career statistics

College

|-
| style="text-align:left;"| 2020–21
| style="text-align:left;"| Stanford
| 32 || 20 || 18.4 || .578 || .367 || .647 || 6.7 || 0.9 || 0.6 || 2.7 || 1.3 || 9.9
|-
| style="text-align:left;"| 2021–22
| style="text-align:left;"| Stanford
| 35 || 34 || 21.9 || .556 || .355 || .615 || 8.1 || 1.2 || 0.9 || 2.6 || 1.6 || 13.5
|-
| style="text-align:left;"| 2022–23
| style="text-align:left;"| Stanford
| 34 || 34 || 24.8 || .486 || .213 || .848 || 9.6 || 1.8 || 0.5 || 3.5 || 2.4 || 15.1

National team career
Brink represented the United States at the 2018 FIBA Under-17 World Cup in Belarus. She averaged 3.6 points and 4.6 rebounds per game, as her team won the gold medal. Brink helped the United States win another gold medal at the 2019 FIBA Under-19 World Cup in Thailand, averaging 2.0 points and 3.4 rebounds per game.

References

External links

Stanford Cardinal bio

2001 births
Living people
American women's basketball players
Basketball players from Oregon
Basketball players from New Jersey
Sportspeople from Beaverton, Oregon
People from Princeton, New Jersey
Small forwards
Sportspeople from Mercer County, New Jersey
Power forwards (basketball)
Stanford Cardinal women's basketball players
McDonald's High School All-Americans
All-American college women's basketball players
21st-century American women